Northfield is an unincorporated community in Union Township, Boone County, in the U.S. state of Indiana.

History
Northfield was laid out in 1834. A post office was established at Northfield in 1834, and remained in operation until it was discontinued in 1897.

Geography

References

Unincorporated communities in Boone County, Indiana
Unincorporated communities in Indiana
Indianapolis metropolitan area